is a Shinto shrine in the Kokufu-cho neighborhood of the city of Tottori in Tottori Prefecture, Japan. It is the ichinomiya of former Inaba Province. The main festival of the shrine is held annually on April 21.

Enshrined kami
The kami enshrined at Ube Jinja is:
 , the legendary Japanese hero-statesman of the 1st century, who is also regarded as a deity of longevity.

History

The origins of Ube Jinja are unknown. Although there is no documentary evidence, it is believed that it began as the family shrine for the Ifubuki clan of Kofun period, who were the kuni no miyatsuko of Inaba, and who possessed sacred swords given to them by Emperor Seimu.  According to the Heian period Engishiki, during the reign of the legendary Emperor Nintoku, Takenouchi no Sukune, who was over 360 years old at the time, went missing in Kamekinzan on the hillside of Mt. Ube in Inaba Province. There are two monoliths behind the shrine which are part of a  kofun said to be Takenouchi no Sukune's burial mound. The shrine is located near the site of the provincialcapital of Inaba, and there are many archaeological sites in the vicinity. In the Muromachi period, the shrine gradually lost its estates and fell into decline. In 1581, when Toyotomi Hideyoshi attacked Tottori Castle, the shrine was reduced to ashes. It was reconstructed in 1633 with the assistance of Ikeda Mitsunaka, the daimyō of Tottori Domain under the Tokugawa shogunate.

During the Meiji period era of State Shinto, the shrine was rated as a  under the Modern system of ranked Shinto Shrines The position of kannushi at the shrine has been a hereditary position of the Ifubuki clan since ancient times. The composer Akira Ifukube is the grandson of the 65th generation kannushi.

The shrine has been rebuilt frequently since it was founded, and the current main shrine was rebuilt in 1898.  The Haiden of Ube Jinja is depicted on the 5-yen bank note in circulation from 1899 to 1934.

The shrine is located a 20-minute walk from Tottori Station on the JR West San'in Main Line.

Gallery

See also
List of Shinto shrines
Ichinomiya

References
 Plutschow, Herbe. Matsuri: The Festivals of Japan. RoutledgeCurzon (1996) 
 Ponsonby-Fane, Richard Arthur Brabazon. (1959).  The Imperial House of Japan. Kyoto: Ponsonby Memorial Society. OCLC 194887

Notes

External links

 
Tottori Tourist Information
Tottori City home page

Shinto shrines in Tottori Prefecture
Inaba Province
Tottori (city)
Ichinomiya
Beppyo shrines